"Falling Again" is a song written by Bob McDill, and recorded by American country music artist Don Williams.  It was released in February 1981 as the second single from the album I Believe in You.  The song reached number 6 on the Billboard Hot Country Singles & Tracks chart.

Charts

Weekly charts

Year-end charts

References

1981 singles
1980 songs
Don Williams songs
Songs written by Bob McDill
Song recordings produced by Garth Fundis
MCA Records singles